Unarmed – Best of 25th Anniversary is the 25th anniversary celebration album by the German power metal band Helloween. It is a compilation of re-recorded versions of Helloween songs in an acoustic/symphonic style. It includes a 70-piece Prague Symphony Orchestra performing "The Keeper's Trilogy", a 17-minute medley consisting of the songs "Halloween", "Keeper of the Seven Keys" and "The King for a 1000 Years". Many guest musicians are featured on the tracks.

Commenting on the album on 2011, the bass guitarist Markus Grosskopf said,

The vocalist Andi Deris, however, panned the album in a 2015 interview, saying he never liked the idea of doing it and that the record company "raped" the band to do it. He commented,

Track listing

Charts

Credits
Andi Deris – vocals
Michael Weikath – guitar (tracks 1-5, 7-11)
Sascha Gerstner – guitar
Markus Grosskopf – bass guitar (tracks 1-5, 7-11)
Dani Löble – drums (tracks 1-5, 7-11)
Prague Symphony Orchestra (tracks 5, 11)
Gero Drnek (Fury in the Slaughterhouse) - accordion
Andreas Becker (Peter Maffay) - guitar (tracks 2, 4, 7, 9)
Albie Donnelly (Supercharge) - saxophone (track 1)
Matthias Ulmer - piano (tracks 1, 3, 5, 10, 11)
Nippy Noya - percussion (tracks 1-4, 6, 7, 9, 10)
Harriet Ohlsson (Hellsongs) - duet vocals, arrangement (track 6)
Kalle Karlsson (Hellsongs) - guitar, arrangement (track 6)
Johan Bringhed (Hellsongs) - piano, arrangement (track 6)
Richard Naxton, Johnny Clucas, Dan Hoadley, Chris Tickner, Richard Collier, Gerry O'Beime, Gunther Laudahn, Lawrence White, Jan-Eric Kohrs, Rob Fardell (Gregorian) - choir
Charlie Bauerfeind - producer (tracks 1-5, 7-11)
Petter Ericsson - producer (track 6)

References

2009 compilation albums
Helloween albums
SPV/Steamhammer compilation albums
Albums produced by Charlie Bauerfeind